"Colocao" is a song by Argentine rapper and singer Nicki Nicole. It was released on May 13, 2020 through Dale Play Records and Sony Music Latin. The song was produced by Argentine producers Bizarrap and Evlay. The music video for the song was recorded at Nicki Nicole's house due to the COVID-19 pandemic, it was directed by Jess "La Pola" Praznik. The music video for the song has more than 100 million views on YouTube. The song reached number 6 on the Billboard Argentina Hot 100 chart and went gold in Argentina.

Charts

Certifications

See also
List of Billboard Argentina Hot 100 top-ten singles in 2021

References

2020 singles
2020 songs
Argentine songs
Nicki Nicole songs
Song recordings produced by Bizarrap
Sony Music Latin singles
Songs written by Nicki Nicole